

Playing career

Tyrone "Ty" Levett (born February 5, 1980) is a former American professional basketball player who played for the Saint John Mill Rats of the National Basketball League of Canada (NBL). He has experience competing on several different pro teams outside the United States, including clubs from Sweden and Austria. Levett played college basketball at Alabama State before taking part in workouts for the Miami Heat and Detroit Pistons of the National Basketball Association (NBA). In Canada, he became one of the league's all-time top scorers. Although he primarily played the small forward position, Levett was also capable of assuming the role of a point guard, shooting guard, and power forward.  

Levett returned back to his alma mater Alabama State in 2019 as the Director of Basketball Operations for the Alabama State Hornets Basketball. Levett is currently an Assistant Coach for the Hornets program under Head Coach Tony Madlock.

References

External links 
 FIBA profile
 Tyrone Levett at RealGM
 Tyrone Levett at USBasket.com

Living people
1980 births
American expatriate basketball people in Austria
American expatriate basketball people in Canada
American expatriate basketball people in Ireland
American expatriate basketball people in Japan
American expatriate basketball people in Portugal
American expatriate basketball people in Sweden
Basketball players from Alabama
American men's basketball players
Alabama State Hornets basketball players
Jämtland Basket players
LF Basket Norrbotten players
London Lightning players
Halifax Rainmen players
Niigata Albirex BB players
Saint John Mill Rats players
Forwards (basketball)